Akusha-Dargo Union was the union of free Dargin societies centered in the village of Akusha. It included the territories of the current Levashinsky and Akushinsky districts of Dagestan.

References 

1854 disestablishments
History of Dagestan
Dargwa people